Royalton is an unincorporated community located in the town of Royalton, Waupaca County, Wisconsin, United States.

References

Unincorporated communities in Waupaca County, Wisconsin
Unincorporated communities in Wisconsin